Southern Foundries (1926) Ltd v Shirlaw [1940] AC 701 is an important English contract law and company law case. In the field of contracts it is well known for MacKinnon LJ's decision in the Court of Appeal, where he put forth the "officious bystander" formulation for determining what terms should be implied into agreements by the courts. In the field of company law, it is known primarily to stand for the principle that damages may be sought for breach of contract by a director even though a contract may de facto constrain the exercise of powers to sack people found in the company's constitution.

Facts
Mr Shirlaw had been the managing director of Southern Foundries Ltd, which was in the business of iron castings. But then another company called ‘Federated Foundries Ltd’ took over the business. The new owners had altered article 8 of Southern Foundries Ltd's constitution, empowering two directors and the secretary (who were friends of Federated Foundries) to remove any director. Then they acted on it, by sacking Mr Shirlaw. Mr Shirlaw's contract, signed in 1933 stated that he was to remain in post for ten years.

Mr Shirlaw sued the company for breach of contract, claiming for an injunction to stay in office or substantial damages.

Judgment
Humphrey's J in the High Court awarded £12,000 to Mr Shirlaw for breach of contract.

Court of Appeal
The Court of Appeal held (Sir Wilfrid Greene MR dissenting on this point) that it was an implied term in the 21 December 1933 agreement that the company would not remove Mr Shirlaw from his directorship for the time in which he was appointed as managing director. Furthermore, it was held that it was an implied term that the company would not alter its articles to create a right of removal and there was no case for reducing the damages awarded by the High Court.

At the end of his judgment MacKinnon LJ read out this famous passage.

Goddard LJ concurred with MacKinnon LJ

House of Lords
Viscount Maugham, Lord Atkin, Lord Wright, Lord Romer and Lord Porter upheld the decision of the Court of Appeal. The House of Lords held it was wrong to act on the change in the articles, that this was a breach of contract, and upheld the £12,000 damages award. Lord Atkin gave a succinct first judgment.

Lord Wright, concurring, stated that it was a breach of contract if a director was removed without cause.

See also

UK company law
Imperial Hydropathic Hotel Co, Blackpool v Hampson (1882) 23 Ch D 1
Isle of Wight Railway Company v Tahourdin (1884) LR 25 Ch D 320

References 

United Kingdom company case law
English contract case law
House of Lords cases
1940 in British law
1940 in case law